Thirumalaikoil is a shrine dedicated to Lord Thirumalai Kumaraswamy at Panpozhil near Tenkasi in Tirunelveli district, Tamil Nadu, India. It was built by Thiruvarutchelvar Sivakami Ammaiyar. Poets Arunagirinather and Achanputhur Subbaiah have written many poems on the saint. It is a hilltop shrine, with 625 steps of pathway to reach the temple.  The hill is adjacent to Western Ghats and Kavira Hills. It is 15 km from the Lord Kasivishwanathar temple in Tenkasi, Kurtallam Falls, Ezhanji Kumarakoil, and Ayikudi Balasubramanya Swami Temple.  The temple is 650 km from Chennai and 90 km away from Thiruvananthapuram. Surrounding the temple (which is situated above 540 feet in the hills) are green fields, coconut trees, ponds, a number of windmills and a dam; the towns of Tenkasi and Shenkottai are visible from the hilltop in the panorama which awaits visitors. Many musical film scenes have been shot at this location.

Thiruvarutselvar Sivakami Ammaiyar 
Thiruvarutselvar Sivakami Ammaiyar, a devotee of Lord Thirumalaikumaraswamy, was born in Neduvayal Achanputhur (near Panpozhil, on the Hanuman River) into a wealthy and benevolent family (her parents were Muthuswamy Thevar and Kulalvaimozhi) around 1784 and died in 1854, aged 70. Although she received no secondary education, she was known to read and write. Sivakami Ammaiyar married Kankamuthu, a philanthropic farmer and son of Sangamuthu and Uthamiammal, and lived a peaceful life. Muthu, a devotee of Lord Annamalaiyar of Thiruvannamalai, and his wife helped their neighbors; for example, they built a bridge spanning the Hanuman River which is still known as Kankamuthu Bridge. Sivakami Ammaiyar and Kankamuthu treated all the peoples equally, employing Sangilimadan (from a Parayar caste). Since the couple was childless, so they treated all the village children as their own. They served many saints of all religions. When a Muslim holy man named Walar Masthan visited their village, the couple called and told him of their childlessness. Walar Masthan is said to have replied, "I know your problems; you were not blessed by becoming a mother, but on the Thirumalai Murugan hilltop west of here is your family god. Go and serve him for the rest of your life". The couple was unsure what to do but Murugan appeared in a dream as a child to Sivakami Ammaiyar, telling them both to go to Vandadumpottal and build him a temple on the hilltop. Sivakami Ammaiyar began building the temple, a difficult task due to the elevation; to raise the money needed, she sold all her property.

Poetry 
 "Thirumalai Andavar Kuravaji" – Author unknown; poem published in Tamil Tatha by Dr. Uu. Ve. Saminathan Iyer
 "Thirumalai Yamah Vanthathi" - Nellai Kavirasu Pandaramars
 "Thirupugazal" - Aunagirinather
 "Thirumalai Kumaraswamy Thirupugazal" - Sankarapandian Pillai
 "Thirumalai Murugan Pillai Tamil" - Kavira Pandarathaiyar
 Poems by Achanputhur N. Subbaih

References

External links
 Musical sequence from Punngai Mannan, filmed in Thirumalaikoil 
 Shrine photos

Hindu temples in Tirunelveli district